Jules Philippe Marie de Burlet (10 April 1844 – 1 March 1897) was a Belgian Catholic Party politician.

Born in Ixelles, de Burlet was educated as a lawyer. He practised law in Nivelles, where he made his home, and he served as mayor of the town from 1872 to 1891.

From 1884 he represented the Nivelles constituency in the Belgian Chamber of People's Representatives. In  1891 he became Interior minister and in 1894 he left the chamber and became a member of the Belgian Senate. At the same time he became the prime minister of Belgium. On leaving office he was made an honorary minister of State and served as Belgian ambassador to Portugal in 1896–1897.

He died in Nivelles in 1897.

See also
 :fr:Famille de Burlet
 Jules de Burlet in ODIS - Online Database for Intermediary Structures

References

1844 births
1897 deaths
Catholic Party (Belgium) politicians
People from Ixelles
Prime Ministers of Belgium